Xylacanthus may refer to:
 Xylacanthus (fish), a genus of fossil Acanthodii in the family Ischnacanthidae
 Xylacanthus (plant), a genus of flowering plants in the family Acanthaceae